Scandicci Calcio is an Italian association football club located in Scandicci, Tuscany. It currently plays in Serie D.

History
The club was founded in 1908.

Colors and badge 
Its colors are blue and white.

References

External links
Official site

Football clubs in Italy
Football clubs in Tuscany
Association football clubs established in 1908
1908 establishments in Italy